Meshack is a rural unincorporated community in northwestern Monroe County, Kentucky, United States. The community is located around the intersection of Kentucky Route 100 and Meshack Creek.

References

Unincorporated communities in Monroe County, Kentucky
Unincorporated communities in Kentucky